Kiong, or Kayon, is a nearly extinct Upper Cross River language of Nigeria. Okoyong speakers of the Kiong language are geographically located in the Odukpani and Akamkpa region of Cross River State.

References

External links 
 ELAR archive of Documenting libation rituals in Kiong

Languages of Nigeria
Upper Cross River languages